"Perro Fiel" is a song by Colombian singer Shakira, featuring American singer Nicky Jam. It was written by Shakira, Nicky Jam, Saga WhiteBlack and Juan Medina, and produced by the former three. The song was released on 29 September 2017 as the sixth single from Shakira's eleventh studio album, El Dorado (2017).

Background
The song was first recorded by American singer Nicky Jam on his own, recording the track as a demo for his album Fénix, though it was never fully executed for the album and was presented later to Shakira, who wrote new lyrics for the song and made it a part of her album. The original demo was leaked on the Internet in late 2016.

Chart performance
As of September 2017, the song has moved almost 19,000 copies in the United States according to Nielsen SoundScan.

Music video
The music video was filmed and directed by Jaume de Laiguana in late July 2017 in Barcelona and was released on 15 September 2017.

Accolades

Charts

Weekly charts

Year-end charts

Certifications

See also
List of number-one songs of 2017 (Mexico)
List of airplay number-one hits of the 2010s (Argentina)
List of Billboard number-one Latin songs of 2017
List of Billboard number-one Latin songs of 2018

References

2017 songs
2017 singles
Shakira songs
Nicky Jam songs
Spanish-language songs
Songs written by Shakira
Songs written by Nicky Jam
Latin pop songs
Reggaeton songs